Leptomonas is a genus of parasitic flagellate protist belonging to family Trypanosomatidae and subfamily Leishmaniinae sensu Maslov & Lukeš 2012. It is a monoxenous parasite of mainly Hemiptera, Diptera, and Siphonaptera insects.

In addition to Leptomonas, one-host trypanosomatids from insects have been traditionally placed in genera Crithidia, Blastocrithidia, Herpetomonas, Rhynchoidomonas, and  Wallaceina.

Systematics 

There are 18 species of Leptomonas.
 Leptomonas agilis Chatton
 Leptomonas brasiliense (Franchini) França
 Leptomonas buetschlii W.S. Kent
 Leptomonas ciliatorum H.-D. Görtz & J. Dieckmann, 1987
 Leptomonas costoris Wallace, Todd & Rogers
 Leptomonas davidi Lafont
 Leptomonas gerridis (Patton) Berliner
 Leptomonas karyophilus Gillies & Hanson
 Leptomonas lata Skvortzov
 Leptomonas leptoglossi Hanson & McGhee
 Leptomonas lunulata Massart
 Leptomonas lygaei (Patton) Berliner
 Leptomonas melophagia (Flu) Berliner
 Leptomonas mesnili Roubaud
 Leptomonas muscae-domesticae (Diesing) Senn
 Leptomonas pangoniae Rodhain, Pons, Vandenbranden & Bequaert
 Leptomonas pisciformis Skvortzov
 Leptomonas soudanensis Roubaud

References 

Trypanosomatida
Parasitic excavates
Euglenozoa genera